Bettowynd Creek, a partly perennial stream of the Moruya River catchment, is located in the Southern Tablelands and South Coast regions of New South Wales, Australia.

Course and features
The river flows generally northeast and then southeast before reaching its confluence with the Deua River in remote country south of the Monga National Park. The river descends  over its  course.

See also

 Rivers of New South Wales
 List of rivers of New South Wales (A-K)
 List of rivers of Australia

References

External links
 

Rivers of New South Wales
Southern Tablelands